is a subway station in Taitō, Tokyo, Japan, jointly operated by Toei Subway and Metropolitan Intercity Railway Company.

Lines 
Shin-okachimachi Station is served by the following two lines.
 Toei Ōedo Line (E-10)
 Tsukuba Express (02)

Platforms

Toei 
The station consists of an island platform serving two tracks.

Tsukuba Express 
In 2019, platform expansion works commenced to accommodate 8-car trains in the future.

History 
The station opened on December 12, 2000, when the Ōedo Line started operation. The services on the Tsukuba Express Line started on August 24, 2005.

External links
This article incorporates information from the corresponding article on the Japanese Wikipedia.

 Toei Shin-okachimachi Station 
 TX Shin-Okachimachi Station 

Railway stations in Tokyo
Railway stations in Japan opened in 2000
Stations of Tsukuba Express